Postage stamps and postal history of Israel and Palestine refers to either:
Postage stamps and postal history of Israel
Postage stamps and postal history of Palestine